Sespe Gorge is a rugged section of the upper Sespe Creek in Ventura County, southern California. The formation is several miles downstream from the creek's headwaters. Highway 33 winds directly through the gorge.

References

Canyons and gorges of California
Landforms of Ventura County, California